Dušan Podpečan (born 12 October 1975 in Celje) is a Slovenian handball player who competed in the 2004 Summer Olympics.

References

1975 births
Living people
Slovenian male handball players
Olympic handball players of Slovenia
Handball players at the 2004 Summer Olympics
Sportspeople from Celje